Social Suicide may refer to:

 Social suicide
 Term meaning to commit a faux pas that ostracises you from society and social events
 Social Suicide (album), a 2006 album by Bomb Factory
 Social Suicide (film), a 2015 British romantic drama thriller